Samuel Phillips Lee (February 13, 1812 – June 5, 1897) was an officer of the United States Navy. In the American Civil War, he took part in the New Orleans campaign, before commanding the North Atlantic Blockading Squadron, covering the coastlines and inland waters of Virginia and North Carolina, and finally the Mississippi River Squadron. As a cousin of Robert E. Lee, his refusal to join the Confederates' side by remaining loyal to the U.S. demonstrated the extent to which the war had divided families. Lee married the daughter of Francis P. Blair, Sr., and their house in Washington is now the president's official guest house.

Early life and education
Lee was born at "Sully" in Fairfax County, Virginia, to Francis Lightfoot Lee II and Jane Fitzgerald. He was the grandson of Richard Henry Lee, great-nephew of Francis Lightfoot Lee I, brother-in-law of Francis Preston Blair, Jr., and of Montgomery Blair, and was third cousin of Robert E. Lee. He was appointed a midshipman in the U.S. Navy in November 1825 and subsequently saw extensive service at sea, including combat action during the Mexican–American War and exploration, surveying and oceanographic duty.

Career
At the outbreak of the American Civil War in 1861, Lee held the rank of commander and was captain of the sloop of war  in the East Indies, sailing her home on his own initiative to join the blockade of the Southern coast. Commander Lee commanded the new steam sloop  during the New Orleans campaign and subsequent operations on the Mississippi River in the first half of 1862. Lee became well known in Washington society due to the influence of his wife, the former Elizabeth Blair, of Maryland.

When asked about his loyalty, Lee famously replied, "When I find the word Virginia in my commission I will join the Confederacy." This quote is often referenced by historians in contrast to the actions of his cousin Robert E. Lee, to show how the war divided families.

In September 1862, Lee was placed in command of the North Atlantic Blockading Squadron with the rank of Acting rear admiral. He led this force for over two years, during which it was responsible for the blockade of the North Carolina coast and operations on North Carolina and Virginia inland waters, all areas of very active combat between Union and Confederate forces. Acting Rear Admiral Lee transferred to the command of the Mississippi River Squadron in October 1864 and led it to the end of the Civil War in 1865.

Reverting to his permanent rank of captain after the Civil War, Lee extensively served in the Washington, D.C. area. He was promoted to rear admiral in 1870 and retired from active service in February 1873.

Personal life
In 1859, Lee's father-in-law, Francis Preston Blair, built a house for Lee and his wife (Francis's daughter Elizabeth Blair) next door to his own. These two houses, within a block of the White House in Washington, D.C., were later combined into one house and became the property of the U.S. government. Today they are the Blair-Lee House, used by the president as his guest house. Upon retirement he moved to the family home in Silver Spring, Maryland, where he died on June 5, 1897.

Legacy
Two U.S. Navy ships have been named in honor of Rear Admiral Samuel Phillips Lee, the destroyer , which was commissioned in October 1920 and lost by stranding in September 1923, and the research vessel  (ex-AGS-31), which was in naval service between 1968 and 1974.

References

External links

1812 births
1897 deaths
Union Navy admirals
United States Navy admirals
Samuel
People from Chantilly, Virginia
People of Virginia in the American Civil War
Blair family